Caementodon is an extinct genus of rhinoceros of the clade Elasmotheriinae endemic to Europe and Asia during the Miocene.

References

Miocene rhinoceroses
Miocene mammals of Europe
Miocene mammals of Asia